The Aizhai Bridge is a suspension bridge on the G65 Baotou–Maoming Expressway near Jishou, Hunan, China. The bridge was built as part of an expressway from southwest China's Chongqing Municipality to Changsha.

The bridge is famous for the spectacular view it offers those crossing it.

Of the world's 400 or so highest bridges, none has a main span as long as Aizhai. It is also the world's highest and longest tunnel-to-tunnel bridge. The bridge contains 1888 lights to increase visibility at night.

Construction on the Aizhai Bridge began in October 2007 and was completed by the end of 2011, ahead of schedule. The bridge was temporarily opened to pedestrians during the 2012 Spring Festival and was formally opened to traffic in March 2012.

The bridge and the associated road construction were projected to reduce the travel time between Jishou and Chadong from 4 hours to less than 1 hour.

In September 2012, the Aizhai Bridge was the site of an international BASE jumping festival that included more than 40 jumpers from 13 countries.

See also
 List of bridges in China
 List of highest bridges in the world
 List of longest suspension bridge spans

References

External links
 
Aizhai Bridge on HighestBridges.com

 Video from The Telegraph including aerial views of the Aizhai Bridge

Bridges in Hunan
Bridges completed in 2012
Suspension bridges in China